Dicirenone (INN, USAN; developmental code name SC-26304; also known as 7α-carboxyisopropylspirolactone) is a synthetic, steroidal antimineralocorticoid of the spirolactone group which was developed as a diuretic and antihypertensive agent but was never marketed. It was synthesized and assayed in 1974. Similarly to other spirolactones like spironolactone, dicirenone also possesses antiandrogen activity, albeit with relatively reduced affinity.

References

Abandoned drugs
Antimineralocorticoids
Carboxylic acids
Esters
Isopropyl esters
Lactones
Pregnanes
Spiro compounds
Spirolactones
Steroidal antiandrogens